Louis-Henri Baratte (born 20 April 1805) was a French scholar from  Criquetot-l'Esneval, Normandy.

Biography 
A doctor of medicine, Baratte undertook to publish a collection of portraits of the famous Normans composed of at least two thousand portraits engraved in copperplate. This collection, which was acquired in 1847 by the library of Rouen, received the collaboration of many other Norman men of letters, such as J.-F. Destigny from Caen, J. Mortent, Édouard Neveu, Georges Mancel, Alphonse Le Flaguais, J. Charma, Théodore-Éloi Lebreton. A. Delavigne, R. Deslandes and G. Lhéry, and also Pierre-François Tissot and Jules Janin.

Publications 
 Poètes normands, Paris, Lacrampe, 1845.
 Essai de littérature médicale ; choix des meilleurs morceaux en prose et en vers, extraits des auteurs les plus célèbres qui ont traité de la médecine et de son application, Paris, Baillière, 1846

Sources 
 Société havraise d’études diverses, Bio-bibliographie des écrivains de l'arrondissement du Havre, éd. Auguste Lechevalier, Le Havre, H. Micaux, 1903.

References

External links 
 Louis-Henri Baratte on Amazon

19th-century French physicians
19th-century French writers
Writers from Normandy
People from Seine-Maritime
1805 births
Year of death missing
Date of death missing